Clarence James "Peck" Griffin (January 19, 1888 – March 28, 1973) was an American tennis player. His best major performance in singles was reaching the semi-finals of the 1916 U.S. National Championships (where he beat Wallace F. Johnson before losing to R. Norris Williams). He also reached the quarter-finals in 1914, 1915, 1917 and 1920.

Biography
He was born on January 19, 1888, in San Francisco, California.

Griffin ranked in singles in the U.S. Top Ten three times: he was No. 7 in 1915 and No. 6 in both 1916 and 1920. In addition to his singles success, Griffin also made a mark in doubles with fellow Californian Bill Johnston.

In 1913 he won the singles title at the Niagara International Tennis Tournament defeating  Edward H. Whitney in four sets. He successfully defended his title in the challenge round in the following year, 1914, against George Church, also in four sets. He won the singles and doubles titles at the Cincinnati tournament in 1915 and was a doubles champion and singles finalist in Cincinnati in 1916. In 1915 he was victorious in the Tri-State Championship, disposing W.S. McElroy in the challenge round in three straight sets.

Griffin, and doubles partner Johnston, won the U.S. doubles title three times (1915, 1916, and 1920), and Griffin also reached the 1913 doubles final with John Strachan. He and Strachan won the U.S. Clay Court title that year, and in 1914 Griffin reached his singles final in a comeback beating of Elia Fottrell, 3–6, 6–8, 8–6, 6–0, 6–2, for the Clay Court singles crown (held that year in Cincinnati).

In 1929, he married Mildred Talbot De Camp, daughter of T. James Talbot of Los Angeles.

He died on March 28, 1973.

Legacy
He was a 5-foot-7 right-handed player and entered the International Tennis Hall of Fame in 1970. His nephew was entertainer Merv Griffin.

Grand Slam finals

Doubles (3 titles, 1 runner-up)

References

External links
 

1888 births
1973 deaths
American male tennis players
Tennis players from San Francisco
International Tennis Hall of Fame inductees
United States National champions (tennis)
Grand Slam (tennis) champions in men's doubles